Leane may refer to:


People

Surname
 Lionel Leane (fl. 1940s), detective on South Australia's Tamam Shud case
 Pat Leane (1930–2018), Australian Olympic track and field athlete
 Raymond Leane (1878–1962), Australian Army officer and police commissioner
 Shaun Leane (born 1963), Australia politician
 Shaun Leane (jeweller) (born 1969), British jewellery designer

Given Name
 Léane Labrèche-Dor (born 1988), Canadian actress
 Marion Leane Smith (1891–1957), Aboriginal Australian-Canadian nurse in WWI
 Leane Suniar (1948–2021), Indonesian Olympic archer
 Leane Zugsmith (1903–1969), American writer

Other uses
 Lough Leane, a lake in Killarney, Ireland

See also
 Lean (disambiguation)
 Leaney, a surname